Wahlenbergia capillaris, commonly known as tufted bluebell, is a plant in the family Campanulaceae and is native to Australia and New Guinea. The leaves are mostly linear with a few scattered teeth on the sides and the flowers are blue, bell-shaped with five lobes and arranged in cymes. This bluebell is widespread and common, occurring in all Australian mainland states and territories.

Description
The leaves are sometimes arranged up to stems and sometimes only near the base of the plant.

Taxonomy and naming
The tufted bluebell was first formally described in 1839 by George Loddiges who gave it the name Campanula capillaris and published the description in The Botanical Cabinet. In 1839, George Don changed the name to Wahlenbergia capillaris.

Roger Carolin rejected the name Campanula capillaris because Loddiges' description was inadequate, and in 1965 Carolin gave the species the name Wahlenbergia communis. In 2016, Ian Turner resurrected Loddiges' name and the change has been accepted by the World Checklist of Selected Plant Families and the Australian Plant Census. The specific epithet (capillaris) is a Latin word meaning "of hair".

Distribution and habitat
Wahlenbergia capillaris is widespread in all mainland states and territories of Australia and is especially common in disturbed sites and along roadsides.

References

capillaris
Flora of Australia
Flora of New Guinea
Plants described in 1839